Vehicle registration plates of Azerbaijan are usually composed of two numbers (identifying the vehicle registration department), a hyphen, two letters, a hyphen and three numbers (e.g. 31-PO-069), the plates are coloured black font on a white background. The plates are the same size as European plates and usually have an Azerbaijani flag and the initials 'AZ' on the left side.

In September 2011, new style plates with a rectangular flag and a microchip were introduced. The Azerbaijan license plate incorporates an RFiD TAG/chip, the RFiD TAG is placed on the lower left corner of the license plate below the Azerbaijan national flag, in most plates the TAG has the "AZ" letters printed on. The TAG may move to the top right corner and lose the "AZ" printing on some of the more squared license plate formats. The colour of the LP still varies depending on the vehicles usage and ownership.

The Portuguese company Porta Saber, Lda is supplying the license plate RFiD TAG and the License Plate RFiD Reading System and Software.

Previous series 

Between 1977 and 1993, Azerbaijan registration plates were manufactured in accordance with the Soviet GOST 3207-77 standard. The alphanumeric sequence took the form of: x #### XX, where x is a lowercase Cyrillic serial/counter letter; # is any digit in the range 0–9; and XX are two uppercase Cyrillic letters indicating where the vehicle was first registered.

Azerbaijan used codes АГ, АЖ and АЗ without particularity of city or department, and HK was only used for Nagorno-Karabakh.

Car designations 
As with Turkish plates (which in turn adopted a reversed version of the former French license plate system), in Azeri plates the first two digits of the license plate represent the department, followed by a progressive 2-letter and 3-number system (progression starting with 90-AA-001 and ending with 90-ZZ-999). Below is a table of digits and relevant departments (italic means this department is controlled (or mostly-controlled) by Nagorno-Karabakh Republic, bold means this department is a part of Naxçıvan AR):

Types of plates

Government Officials - Composed 31 AA 069
Ministry of Defence - Composed 31 AM 069
Ministry of Internal Affairs - Composed 31 AP 069
Ministry of Justice - Composed 31 AO 069
Presidential Administration - Composed 31 PA 069
President's Secret Service - Composed 31 PM 069
State Security Service - Composed 31 AS 069
Trailers - Composed the same way as usual Azerbaijan plates, but with no hyphen.
Foreign series - Composed of a letter, three numbers a space and three more numbers.

External links

AZ-TR | avtomobil dövlət qeydiyyat nişanı | plaka kodları TarPas kanalında.

Transport in Azerbaijan
Azerbaijan
Azerbaijan transport-related lists